Jirapa is the capital town of the Jirapa Municipal in the Upper West Region of Ghana.

Institutions
 The only girls' secondary school in the region, Saint Francis of Assisi Girls' Secondary School, is situated in the town.
 Jirapa Senior Secondary  School.
 St. Joseph's Hospital in Jirapa is the district hospital. The work was started by the Franciscan Missionaries of Mary in 1949 as a wound-dressing centre, and was converted to a hospital and adopted by the Catholic Mission of Tamale in 1953. Two training schools originally attached to the hospital are now the autonomous Jirapa Nurses' Training College and Jirapa Midwifery Training College. There is also a community health training school known as Jirapa Community training school 
 The St. Joseph Orphanage was renovated  in about 2004 by an orphan  who is now resident in Italy. It takes up to 40 newborn orphans from nearby hospitals and looks after them during their early childhood.
 St. Joseph Catholic Church is the oldest Catholic Church in the Upper West Region.
 There is a police station and a district magistrate court.

Religion
There is a very strong Roman Catholic tradition in the Jirapa-Lambussie district. The White Fathers opened a mission station first in Navrongo in 1906, from which three men were delegated to work in Jirapa in 1929. They were allotted a plot of land by the Jirapa Naa (chief) who allegedly wanted to see whether they would be driven out by evil spirits, or vice versa. Despite early conflicts between converts and the local chiefs, and even the resulting disapproval of the British District Commissioner of Lawra, the work was given great impetus by the locally famous 'rain event' of 1932 in which rain fell during a severe drought in the Lawra district, only in Jirapa and in nearby villages following prayer for each case. According to government statistics, 42.5% of the population in the district now claim to be Christian, 96.1% of which are Catholic, the remainder being affiliated to either Islam or traditional religion.

Culture
The Chief of Jirapa is the Paramount Chief of the Jirapa traditional area, and is at present Peter Nanfuri, Naa Ansoleh Ganaa II. There is an annual festival called Bong-Ngo in Jirapa for the chiefs and people of the area. It is held in the last week of April and marks the end of the ban on harvesting the fruit of the Dawadawa tree (Parkia Biglobosa) and the beginning of the farming season.

Language
The local people are called Dagaaba, and speak Dagaare, which is a Gur branch of the Niger–Congo language family. The name of the town, written in Dagaare as Gyerebaa, is pronounced roughly as jira-‘baa, and means 'reed-stream', i.e. a stream of reeds.

References

External links 
 Ghana Districts: Jirapa

Populated places in the Upper West Region